Qashqa Bolagh-e Sofla (also Romanized as Qāshqā Bolāgh-e Soflá) is a village in Chaldoran-e Jonubi Rural District, in the Central District of Chaldoran County, West Azerbaijan Province, Iran. At the 2006 census, its population was 122, in 22 families.

References 

Populated places in Chaldoran County